The ATP Challenger Series is the second tier tour for professional tennis organised by the Association of Tennis Professionals (ATP). The 1989 ATP Challenger Series calendar comprises 94 tournaments, with prize money ranging from $25,000 up to $75,000.

Schedule

January

February

March

April

May

June

July

August

September

October

November

December

See also 
 1989 Grand Prix
 Association of Tennis Professionals
 International Tennis Federation

References

External links 
 Official ATP World Tour Website: Results Archive
 ITF Tennis: Tournament Search

ATP Challenger Tour
1989 in tennis